Ilmari Aalto (August 7, 1891 – 29 September 1934) was a Finnish painter. He was a member of the expressionist November Group led by the artist Tyko Sallinen. Aalto painted still lives, landscapes and portraits.

Life
Aalto was born in Kuopio. He studied at the Central School of Arts and Crafts from 1907 to 1908 and the Finnish Art Society drawing school from 1908 to 1910.

Career
Most of Aalto's landscape paintings are of Töölö and Suursaari. Aalto together with Alfred William Finch aided Eero Järnefelt paint the large landscape Koli at the Helsinki Central Station in 1911. Järnefelt and Finch were more involved in the design, but of the three artists only Aalto dared to climb the tall ladder.

Having begun with expressionism he also got familiar with cubism in 1914. Seeing an Edvard Munch exhibition at the Ateneum soon after his graduation had a strong influence on him and built on the expressionist influences. The first exhibition by cubists and expressionists was held in Finland in 1914, featuring key artists such as from the group Der Blaue Reiter.

After the 1920 trip to Paris, Aalto began to use more colors and strong brush strokes instead of the previously greyish palette. Later, while visiting Paris in 1928 he adopted a more realistic expression, clear contours and unmixed colors. Strongly self-critical, he is said to have destroyed many of his works.

Aalto died of liver cancer at the age of 43. Aalto's spouse was Alli Helena Linnalahti (formerly Ketonen).

Gallery

References

External links 
 Ilmari Aalto taiteilijamatrikkelissa
 Ilmari Aalto Valtion taidemuseon kokoelmissa.
 Kirjav@ - Kansallisgallerian kirjaston kokoelmatietokanta, Ilmari Aalto
 Valkonen, Olli: Maalaustaiteen murros Suomessa 1908-1914 : uudet suuntaukset maalaustaiteessa, taidearvostelussa ja taidekirjoittelussa, Jyväskylän yliopisto, 1973, 
 Vilho Nenonen: Tavattiin Brondalla, Helsinki : Suomalaisen kirjallisuuden seura, 1981, 
 Kirjailijain ja taiteilijain joulukirja, 1917 Suomalainen kirjailijaseura, "Kirjallinen työ" ja Suomen taiteilijaseuran maalariliitto
 Samling Gösta Stenman : finländsk konst - beskrivande katalog utarbetad av Nils-Gustav Hahl, Helsingfors: Söderström, 1932
 A cultural history of the avant-garde in the Nordic countries 1900–1925, edited by Hubert van den Berg et al., Amsterdam; New York (NY) : Rodopi, 2012, 
 Cedercreutz, Emil: Silhouetter 2, klippta af E. Cedercreuz, Helsingfors: Konstnärsgillet, 1916
 Biografiakeskus, Ilmari Aalto

1891 births
1934 deaths
People from Kuopio
People from Kuopio Province (Grand Duchy of Finland)
19th-century Finnish painters
20th-century Finnish painters
Finnish Expressionist painters